Marie Lilienberg (October 17, 1959 – July, 1983) and Maria Wahlen (November 6, 1957 – July, 1983) were a pair of Swedish tourists who were murdered by an unknown assailant while hitchhiking from Northern California to Los Angeles during July 1983. The case attracted significant media attention in the United States in the summer of 1983, before going cold for several years. It gained renewed interest in September 1991, following an anonymous phone call to the Swedish consulate in San Diego, which implicated a Canadian man named Loren in the murders. The anonymous phone call led to the case being featured in an April 1992 episode of Unsolved Mysteries. Loren and the anonymous caller were later identified by police, with the former never being charged for the murders. It is suspected that Loren may have been convicted serial killer Loren Herzog, although this has not been officially confirmed.

Case information
Lilienberg and Wahlen first met each other during January 1983, while working as maids at a skiing resort in Vail, Colorado. Lilienberg was studying in Sweden to be a gymnastics teacher and Wahlen was a pre-school teacher in the country. Lillienberg arrived in the United States during the fall of 1982, having previously visited the country twice before, while it was Wahlen's first time in the country. The duo later visited Hawaii together when the skiing season ended, before deciding to spend the summer together exploring the coast of California. They planned to hitchhike for the Californian trip, as they were running low on money, having only 50 dollars in their final days.

They were last seen on July 22, 1983 in Redwood City, leaving the house of an acquaintance they had met in Colorado. They planned to hitchhike to Los Angeles, where they would catch a flight to New York, which was scheduled to depart in two days. From New York they would have caught another flight back to Sweden. Wahlen kept a detailed diary of her journeys, which stopped being updated on July 22, 1983.

On the day they were scheduled to depart for New York, several items belonging to the women were found in a dumpster behind a business near a freeway in Commerce in  Los Angeles County. Among the items found were Wahlen's diary, as well as two undeveloped rolls of film. Police later developed the photos in order see if they contained clues related to the disappearance.

Their parents, Ove Lilienberg and Lars Wahlen, had kept in regular contact with them via phone calls up until July 16, 1983. The fathers travelled to California at the beginning of August 1983 to find their daughters, making several pleas to the media.

Two heavily decomposed bodies were found by deer hunters on August 18 at Los Padres National Forest near Monterey. (Many years later an Unsolved Mysteries segment identified the area as Santa Barbara.)  Dental records from Sweden confirmed that the bodies were Lilienberg and Wahlen. The women were both naked, having been sexually assaulted and stabbed to death. One of their arms had been torn off, presumably because of wildlife such as coyotes.

The story was picked up by the American media during August 1983, with many noting that the women came from a more trusting society where hitchhiking was not viewed as dangerous.

On September 26, 1991 an anonymous phone caller rang the Swedish consulate in San Diego with information regarding the murders. The caller claimed he knew a Canadian man named Loren who would drive through San Diego every year, on his way to Mexico. He stated Loren hated women, and that Loren had once told him he came across two Swedish women in 1983 who tried to con him. Loren and the anonymous caller were later identified by police, but no one was ever charged for the murders, with the case continuing to remain unsolved.

Loren was described in the call as having red hair. The description of Loren's appearance conflicts with that of Loren Herzog, who many believe may be a possible suspect in the case. Herzog also had no known connections to Canada.

Ove Lilienberg died in 2020.

Unsolved Mysteries segment
The Unsolved Mysteries segment originally aired on April 8, 1992, and was the first coverage of the case on network television in the United States since the discovery of the bodies less than nine years earlier.  The segment featured an interview with trucker Mark Hanson, who remembered once giving the duo a ride from San Diego to Compton. 

Repeat broadcasts on Lifetime Television for many years thereafter included an update that detailed how police had identified Loren Herzog from details provided by the anonymous caller. The update suggested that there was further evidence implicating Herzog in the murders. When Unsolved Mysteries was released to streaming services in the late 2010s, the update was removed, and all references to Herzog’s name were edited out, though the anonymous phone call to the Swedish consulate remained part of the publicly accessible video.

References

1983 in California
1983 murders in the United States
Deaths by person in California
July 1983 events in the United States
Swedish murder victims